Pinnatella limbata is a species of moss in the Neckeraceae family. It is endemic to the Uttara Kannada district of Karnataka, India.  Its natural habitat is rivers. It is threatened by habitat loss.

References

Neckeraceae
Flora of Karnataka
Critically endangered plants
Taxonomy articles created by Polbot